Surveyor Run is a stream in the U.S. state of Pennsylvania. It is a tributary to the West Branch Susquehanna River.

Surveyor Run was named from a pioneer incident when a surveyor and his party became lost near the stream's course. The name sometimes is written "Surveyors Run".

References

Rivers of Pennsylvania
Rivers of Clearfield County, Pennsylvania
Tributaries of the West Branch Susquehanna River